Claudio Andrés Villan Cerpa (born 18 August 1973) is a Chilean former professional footballer who played as a midfielder for clubs in Chile and Indonesia.

Club career
A midfielder, Villan played for Unión Santa Cruz, Provincial Osorno, O'Higgins, Deportes Ovalle, Unión Española and Deportes Melipilla.

Then, he moved to Indonesia, where he played for Persik Kediri, where he coincided with his compatriots Juan Carlos Tapia and Alejandro Bernal, Perseden Denpasar and Persekaba Badung.
As a member of Persik Kediri, he won the league title in 2003.

International career
Villan represented Chile at under-20 level in 1993 alongside players such as Francisco Rojas, Claudio Lizama and Marcelo Salas.

Honours
Persik Kediri
 Liga Indonesia Premier Division: 2003

References

External links
 Claudio Villan at PlaymakerStats.com
 

1973 births
Living people
Footballers from Santiago
Chilean footballers
Chilean expatriate footballers
Chile under-20 international footballers
Deportes Santa Cruz footballers
Provincial Osorno footballers
O'Higgins F.C. footballers
Deportes Ovalle footballers
Unión Española footballers
Deportes Melipilla footballers
Persik Kediri players
Perseden Denpasar players
Primera B de Chile players
Chilean Primera División players
Indonesian Premier Division players
Chilean expatriate sportspeople in Indonesia
Expatriate footballers in Indonesia
Association football midfielders